Louis Sigismond Isaac Halphen (4 February 1880, Paris – 7 October 1950, Paris) was a French medieval specialist and the author of many important books over a long career. He was noteworthy as the editor of a modern edition of the famous classic  Einhard's "Vie de Charlemagne" (Paris, 1947), He was also known as being one of the general editors of the monumental series Peuples et civilisations.

Louis Halphen was born in Paris to mathematician Georges Henri Halphen. He married Germaine Weill, the daughter of Mathieu Weill, in 1910, with whom he had two children: Étienne and Geneviève.

Selected Published Books 
 Le comté d'Anjou au XIe siècle, 1906
 review by S Fanning in Speculum, 1985 "...The essential works on Anjou in this period are Louis Halphen, Le comte d'Anjou au XIe siecle (Paris, 1906)  JSTOR
 La Conquête romaine (with A Piganiol,& P Sagnac (1926) - Presses universitaires de France
 Charlemagne et l'empire carolingien, 1947
translated into English as Charlemagne and the Carolingian Empire, (1977) North-Holland Pub. Co
translated into Spanish as Carlomagno y el imperio carolingio, Unión Tipográfica Editorial Hispano Americana (1955)
 Études sur l'administration de Rome au Moyen Âge (751-1252), (1972) Multigrafica Editrice
 À travers l'histoire du Moyen âge, (1950) - Presses universitaires de France

References

 S. Woolf, "Europe and its Historians" Contemporary European History (2003), 12: 323-337 Cambridge University Press
 Edward R. Tannenbaum "French Scholarship in Modern European History: New Developments since 1945" The Journal of Modern History, Vol. 29, No. 3 (Sep., 1957), pp. 246–252 JSTOR
Mélanges d'histoire du Moyen âge, dédiés à la mémoire de Louis Halphen : Paris : Presses universitaires de France, 1951.

External links
 
 
 
 Biographical note/Publications 
 Id. 

French medievalists
Members of the Académie des Inscriptions et Belles-Lettres
1880 births
1950 deaths
Lycée Hoche alumni
École Nationale des Chartes alumni
French male non-fiction writers
20th-century French historians
20th-century French male writers